Listen, Darling is a 1938 American musical comedy film starring Judy Garland, Freddie Bartholomew, Mary Astor, and Walter Pidgeon. It is best known as being the film in which Judy Garland sings "Zing! Went the Strings of My Heart", which later became one of her standards.

Plot
Pinky Wingate (Judy Garland) is worried about her widowed mother, Dottie (Mary Astor), who is pursuing a loveless relationship with the town's banker, knowing he can help her fund her children's lives. To help her realize this, Pinky and her friend Buzz (Freddie Bartholomew) "kidnap" Dottie and her younger brother Billie (Scotty Beckett), taking them on a road trip to get away from the banker. While they do this, they meet two men, Richard Thurlow (Walter Pidgeon) and J.J Slattery (Alan Hale), who they think would be nice husbands for her mother. Her mother falls in love with Richard Thurlow (Walter Pidgeon) and they go home.

Cast

Box office
According to MGM records, the film earned $381,000 in the US and Canada and $202,000 elsewhere, resulting in a loss of $17,000.

References

External links 
 
 
 
 

1938 films
1938 musical comedy films
1938 romantic comedy films
American musical comedy films
American romantic comedy films
American romantic musical films
American black-and-white films
1930s English-language films
Films directed by Edwin L. Marin
Metro-Goldwyn-Mayer films
1930s romantic musical films
Films with screenplays by Noel Langley
1930s American films